Balabalagan Islands (also spelled Bala-balakang and historically known as Little Paternoster Islands) are an Indonesian archipelago forming an administrative district of Mamuju Regency located in the Makassar Strait off the east coast of Kalimantan (Borneo), between it and Sulawesi and closer to the latter island. The archipelago is also located near the geographic center of Indonesia.

In the 19th century, the islands were recorded as numbering 14, with the largest named Sebunkatang; the channels were shallow and unnavigable, but provided a fertile fishing ground for the island natives, called Biajoo. The islands rest on a coral reef, itself placed on an undersea bank which extends out from Kalimantan, presenting a major hazard to navigation; the Admiralty Pilot has warned that "No vessel should venture among [them] without local knowledge." 
The islands cover a land area of only 1.47 km2 and had a population of 2,201 at the 2020 Census.

References

External links 
 List of alternate names
 Map including Kepulauan Balangan

Archipelagoes of Indonesia
Districts of West Sulawesi
Landforms of West Sulawesi
Underwater diving sites in Indonesia
Populated places in Indonesia